Megachile aurata is a species of bee in the family Megachilidae. It was described by Mitchell in 1930. It is found in South America.

References

Aurata
Insects described in 1930